South Ilion is a hamlet and census-designated place (CDP) in the town of German Flatts in Herkimer County, New York, United States. It was first listed as a CDP prior to the 2020 census.

The community is in southwestern Herkimer County, in the southwestern part of German Flatts. New York State Route 51 runs through the northwestern side of the CDP, following the valley of Steele Creek. The highway leads north into Ilion and southwest  to East Winfield.

Demographics

References 

Census-designated places in Herkimer County, New York
Census-designated places in New York (state)